Queenton may refer to:
 Queenton, Queensland, a suburb of Charters Towers Australia
 Shire of Queenton, a former local government area in Queensland, Australia
 Electoral district of Queenton, a former electorate in the Queensland Legislative Assembly, Australia